Rajeshwari Gayakwad (born 1 June 1991) is an Indian cricketer. She plays as a slow left-arm orthodox bowler. She made her debut in international cricket in a One Day International against Sri Lanka on 19 January 2014.

Personal life
She started playing serious cricket when she was around 18 years. Her father is her biggest inspiration and got her formal coaching. She start playing for the Karnataka women's cricket team and made her international debut in 2014.

Gayakwad lost her father to a cardiac arrest in 2014, right after her debut international series, against Sri Lanka

After the 2017 Women's Cricket World Cup Final, the Water resources minister M. B. Patil gifted a car worth Rs 5 lakh, which she refused and said that her priority at the moment is to get a house for her family. She was at that time the sole breadwinner for her family following the death of her father.

International cricket 
Gayakwad was part of the Indian team to reach the final of the 2017 Women's Cricket World Cup where the team lost to England by nine runs. In the same World Cup tournament, she recorded the best bowling figures for India in the Women's Cricket World Cup history (5/15)

In January 2020, she was named in India's squad for the 2020 ICC Women's T20 World Cup in Australia. In January 2022, she was named in India's team for the 2022 Women's Cricket World Cup in New Zealand. In July 2022, she was named in India's team for the cricket tournament at the 2022 Commonwealth Games in Birmingham, England.

References

External links

 
 

1991 births
Living people
Cricketers from Karnataka
India women One Day International cricketers
India women Test cricketers
India women Twenty20 International cricketers
Indian women cricketers
Karnataka women cricketers
People from Bijapur, Karnataka
Railways women cricketers
Sportswomen from Karnataka
IPL Trailblazers cricketers
IPL Supernovas cricketers
UP Warriorz cricketers
Cricketers at the 2022 Commonwealth Games
Commonwealth Games silver medallists for India
Commonwealth Games medallists in cricket
Medallists at the 2022 Commonwealth Games